The 2006 Armenian Cup was the 15th edition of the Armenian Cup, a football competition. In 2006, the tournament had 12 participants, out of which 4 were reserve teams.

Results

First round

Banants, Kilikia, Mika and Pyunik received byes to the quarter finals.

The first legs were played on 25 and 26 March 2006. The second legs were played on 1 and 2 April 2006.

|}

Quarter-finals
The first legs were played on 5 and 6 April 2006. The second legs were played on 9 and 10 April 2006.

|}

Semi-finals
The first legs were played on 19 April 2006. The second legs were played on 27 April 2006.

|}

Final

See also
 2006 Armenian Premier League
 2006 Armenian First League

External links
 2006 Armenian Cup at Soccerway.com
 2006 Armenian Cup at rsssf.com

Armenian Cup seasons
Armenia
Armenian Cup, 2006